The Russian nobility originated in the 16th century. In 1914 it consisted of approximately 1,900,000 members (about 1.1% of the population) in the Russian Empire.

Up until the February Revolution of 1917, the noble estates staffed most of the Russian government and possessed a Gentry assembly.

The Russian word for nobility, dvorianstvo, derives from Slavonic dvor (двор), meaning the court of a prince or duke (kniaz), and later, of the tsar or emperor. Here, dvor originally referred to servants at the estate of an aristocrat. In the late 16th and early 17th centuries, the system of hierarchy was a system of seniority known as mestnichestvo. The word dvoriane described the highest rank of gentry, who performed duties at the royal court, lived in it (Moskovskie zhiltsy), or were candidates to it, as for many boyar scions (dvorovie deti boiarskie, vybornye deti boiarskie). A nobleman is called a dvorіanin (plural: dvorіane). Pre-Soviet Russia shared with other countries the concept that nobility connotes a status or social category rather than a title. Throughout the 18th and 19th centuries, the title of the nobleman in Russia gradually became a formal status, rather than a reference to a member of the aristocracy, due to a massive influx of commoners via the Table of ranks. Many descendants of the former ancient Russian aristocracy, including royalty, saw their formal standing change to merchants, burghers, or even peasants, while people descended from serfs (like Vladimir Lenin's father) or clergy (like in the ancestry of actress Lyubov Orlova) gained formal nobility.

History

Middle Ages
The nobility arose in the 12th and 13th centuries as the lowest part of the feudal military class, which comprised the court of a prince or an important boyar. From the 14th century land ownership by nobles increased, and by the 17th century, the bulk of feudal lords and the majority of landowners were nobles. The nobles were granted estates out of State lands in return for their service to the Tsar, either for as long as they performed service or for their lifetime. By the 18th century, these estates had become private property. They made up the Landed army—the basic military force of Russia. Peter the Great finalized the status of the nobility, while abolishing the boyar title.

Early modern era in Russia: westernization

Overview
The adoption of the fashions, mannerisms, and ideals of Western Europe by the Russian nobility was a gradual process rooted in the strict guidelines of Peter the Great and the educational reforms of Catherine the Great. While cultural westernization was mostly superficial and restricted to court, it coincided with the efforts of Russian autocrats to link Russia to Western Europe in more fundamental ways – socially, economically and politically. However, Russia's existing economic system, which lacked a sizable middle class and which relied heavily on forced labor, proved an insurmountable obstacle to the development of a free market economy. Furthermore, the lower classes (an overwhelming majority of the Russian population) lived virtually isolated from the upper classes and the imperial court. Thus, most of the nobility's “western” tendencies were largely aesthetic and confined to a tiny proportion of the populace.

As different rulers ascended the throne in the 19th century, each figure brought a different attitude and approach to ruling the nobility. Yet, the cultural impact of Peter I and Catherine II was set in stone. Ironically, by introducing the nobility to political literature from Western Europe, Catherine exposed Russia's autocracy to them as archaic and illiberal. While the nobility was conservative as a whole, a liberal and radical minority remained constant throughout the 19th and early 20th centuries, resorting to violence on multiple occasions in order to challenge Russia's traditional political system (see Decembrist Revolt, Narodnaya Volya).

Before Peter the Great
Although Peter the Great is considered to be the first westernized ruler of Russia, there were, in fact, contacts between the Muscovite nobility and Western Europe before his reign. Ivan III, starting in 1472, sent numerous agents to Italy to study architecture. Both Michael Romanov (1613–1645) and his son Alexis (1645–1676) invited and sponsored European visitors – mostly military, medical, and building specialists – who came to Moscow in foreign dress, speaking foreign languages. When the boyars began to imitate the westerners in dress and hairstyle, Tsar Alexis in 1675 and then Tsar Feodor in 1680 restricted foreign fashions to distinguish between Russians and outsiders,
but these were not effectively enforced until the 1690s.

Under Peter the Great
Peter the Great was, first and foremost, eager to do away with Russia's reputation as an Asiatic land and to propel his new empire onto the political stage of Western Europe. One of the many ways he hoped to achieve this was by changing the upper-class culture; he believed that forcing selected features of western fashion, education, and language onto the nobility would hasten Russia's rise to international prestige. In 1697, he began to send nobles on compulsory trips abroad to England, Holland, and Italy. While the Tsar primarily designed these expeditions for naval training, he also encouraged the noblemen to learn about the arts of the west. Furthermore, Peter prioritized sending Russian natives as opposed to foreign expatriates; he was intent on “breeding” a new nobility that conformed to western customs but represented the Slavic people as a whole. When the travelers returned to Moscow, Peter tested them on their training, insisting on further education for those whose accumulated knowledge was unsatisfactory. By 1724, he had established – for the purpose of scientific study and discovery – the Academy of Sciences, which he modeled after “the ones in Paris, London, Berlin, and other places”.

Peter's westernizing efforts became more radical after 1698 when he returned from his expedition through Europe known as the Grand Embassy. Upon arriving Peter summoned the nobility to his court and personally shaved almost every beard in the room. In 1705 he decreed a beard tax on all men of rank in Moscow and ordered certain officers to seek out noble beards and shave them on sight. He only allowed peasants, priests, and serfs to retain the ingrained and religious Russian tradition of wearing beards, which the Orthodox populace considered an essential aspect of their duty to convey the image of God. He also reformed the clothing of the nobility, replacing the long-sleeved traditional Muscovite robes with European clothing. Beginning in 1699 the tsar decreed strict dress requirements borrowing from German, Hungarian, French and British styles, fining any noblemen who failed to obey. Peter himself, who usually wore German dress and had a trimmed mustache, acted as a prime example. While the nobility universally followed Peter's fashion preferences at court, they greatly resented these styles, which they saw as blasphemous. Away from St. Petersburg, very few noblemen followed Peter's guidelines and enforcement was lax.

Peter also demanded changes in mannerisms and language among nobles. To supply Russians with a basic set of “proper” morals and habits, he ordered publication of manuals on Western etiquette. The most popular of these was The Honourable Mirror of Youth or A Guide to Social Conduct Gathered from Various Authors, a compilation of rules of conduct from numerous European sources, initially published in St. Petersburg in 1717. He also encouraged the learning of foreign languages especially French, which was the foremost political and intellectual language of Europe at the time. For the nobility, these changes felt even more forced than fashion regulations. As with clothing, there was uniform acceptance of Western mannerisms at court but general disregard for them outside of St. Petersburg. Furthermore, when Westerners visited Peter's court they found the image and personality of the courtiers to appear forced and awkward. Friedrich Christian Weber, a representative of Britain, commented in 1716 that the nobles “wear the German Dress; but it is easy to observe on many, that they have not been long used to it”.

Between the Greats
While none of the rulers in power from 1725 to 1762 focused as strongly on cultural westernization, Peter sparked a transformation that was now unstoppable. Through their education and travels, some members of the nobility began to understand the extent to which Russia lagged behind Western Europe in the complexity of their political and educational systems, their technology and economy. By 1750, the ideas of secularism, skepticism and humanism had reached sects of the elite class, providing some with a new worldview and giving Russia a taste of the Enlightenment, of which they had experienced little. While even the most educated of the nobility still supported the autocracy that upheld the feudal system on which they depended, some considered how to make it more representative and to improve the bureaucracy.

The period between Peter I and Catherine II represents gradual yet significant developments in western culture among the nobility. Empress Anna gave many privileges to the nobility. In 1730 she repealed the primogeniture law introduced by Peter the Great allowing the sub-division of estates. In 1736 the age at which nobles had to start service was raised from 15 to 20 and length of service was changed to 25 years instead of life and families with more than one son could keep one to manage the family estate. In 1726 Catherine I and in 1743 Empress Elizabeth further regulated noble dress in a Western direction. In 1755 also during Elizabeth's reign, advanced secondary schools and the University of Moscow were founded with curricula that included foreign languages, philosophy, medicine and law; the material was chiefly based on imported texts from the west. Most significantly Peter III freed the nobility from obligatory civil and military service in 1762, allowing them to pursue personal interests. While some used this liberty as an excuse to lead lavish lives of leisure, a select group became increasingly educated in Western ideas through schooling, reading, and travel. As before, these changes applied to few and represented a gradual shift in noble identity rather than a sudden or universal one. Marc Raeff in Origins of the Russian Intelligentsia has suggested this was not a noble victory but a sign the state didn't need them as much now that they had plenty of trained officials.

Catherine the Great
When Catherine II ascended the throne, she quickly made her political and philosophical opinions clear in the “Instruction” of 1767, a lengthy document which she prepared for the nobility, drawing largely from and even plagiarizing ideas from the west, especially those of Jean-Jacques Rousseau. The point she emphasized first and foremost was that Russia was a truly European state, and her reforms of the court and education reflect this belief. While Catherine was primarily preoccupied with impressing westerners (especially the philosophers, with whom she corresponded in writing), in doing so she also made significant efforts to educate the nobility and expose them to western philosophy and art. She designed an imperial court in the style of Louis XIV, entertaining the nobility with performances of western theatre and music. She encouraged the understanding of French, German, and English languages so that nobles could read classic, historical, and philosophical literature from the west. For the first time in the history of the Russian court, “intellectual pursuits became fashionable”. When foreigners visited the court, Catherine expected the noblemen and their ladies to flaunt not only their western appearance but also their ability to discuss current events in western languages.

Catherine also made specific reforms in institutional education that pushed the nobility's culture further westward. She based Russian education on that of Austria, importing German textbooks and adopting in 1786 a standardized curriculum to be taught in her newly created public schools. While many members of the lower classes were allowed into these schools, Catherine hoped that they could become educated enough to rise through the meritocratic Table of Ranks and eventually become nobles themselves. Catherine also established the Society for the Translation of Foreign Books, “to bring enlightenment to those Russians who could not read either French or German.” It is clear that, like Peter I, Catherine the Great desired to construct a new nobility, a “new race,” which would both resemble western noblemen and prove knowledgeable in discussions of modern issues. And, according to accounts from foreign visitors, the noblemen did, in fact, resemble those of Western Europe in their dress, topics of discussion, and taste in literature and performance.

She also gave away 66,000 serfs in 1762–72, 202,000 in 1773–93, and 100,000 in one day: 18 August 1795. Thus she was able to bind the nobility to herself. From 1782, a kind of uniform was introduced for civilian nobles called uniform of civilian service or simply civilian uniform. The uniform prescribed colors that depended on the territory. The uniform was required at the places of service, at the Court, and at other important public places. The privileges of the nobility were fixed and were legally codified in 1785 in the Charter to the Gentry. The Charter introduced an organization of the nobility: every province (guberniia) and district (uezd) had an Assembly of Nobility. The chair of an assembly was called Province/District Marshal of Nobility. In 1831 Nicholas I restricted the assembly votes to those with over 100 serfs, leaving 21,916 voters.

Late modern era
By 1805 the various ranks of the nobility had become confused, as reflected in War and Peace. In the era of the Napoleonic Wars, there were counts who were wealthier and more important than princes and noble families whose wealth had been dissipated partly through lack of primogeniture, partly through extravagance and due to poor estate-management. Young noblemen served in the military but did not thereby acquire new landed estates. Tolstoy reported later improvements: some nobles paid more attention to estate management, and some, like Andrey Bolkonsky, freed their serfs even before the tsar did so in 1861. Of Russia's nobles, 62.8% were szlachta from the nine western gubernii in 1858 and still 46.1% in 1897.

Obrok or cash rent was most common in the north while barshchina or labor rent was found mainly in the southern Black Earth Region. In the reign of Nicholas I (1825–1855) the latter brought three times the income of cash rent (though this needed less administration). In 1798 Ukrainian landlords were banned from selling serfs separately from land. In 1841 landless nobles were banned also.

Descended from the gentry, the landholding, but not serf-owning, odnodvortsy were between peasants and nobles. They emerged as frontier settlers recruited from the class of boyar scions. The status of the odnodvortsy changed gradually from singleholding farmers to taxed state peasants. 

The nobility was too weak to oppose the Emancipation reform of 1861. In 1858, three million serfs were held by 1,400 landlords (1.4%) while 2 million by 79,000 (78%). In 1820 a fifth of the serfs were mortgaged, half by 1842. By 1859, a third of nobles' estates and two-thirds of their serfs were mortgaged to noble banks or to the state. The nobility was also weakened by the scattering of their estates, lack of primogeniture and the high turnover and mobility from estate to estate.

After the peasant reform of 1861 the economic position of the nobility weakened. The influence of the nobility was further reduced by the new law statutes of 1864, which repealed their right of electing law officer. The reform of the police in 1862 limited the landowners' authority locally, and the establishment of all-estate Zemstvo local government did away with the exclusive influence of nobility in local self-government.

These changes occurred despite the nobles keeping nearly all the meadows and forests and having their debts paid by the state, while the ex-serfs paid 34% over the market price for the shrunken plots they kept. This figure was 90% in the northern regions, 20% in the black-earth region but zero in the Polish provinces. In 1857, 6.79% of serfs were domestic, landless servants who stayed landless after 1861. Only Polish and Romanian domestic serfs got land. Ninety percent of the serfs who got larger plots lived in the eight ex-Polish provinces where the Tsar wanted to weaken the Szlachta. The other 10% lived in Astrakhan and in the barren north. In the whole Empire, peasant land declined 4.1% - 13.3% outside the ex-Polish zone and 23.3% in the 16 black-earth provinces. These redemption payments were not abolished till January 1, 1907.

The influx of New World grain caused a slump in grain prices, forcing the peasants to farm more land. At the same time, despite their efficiency, large peasant households split up (from 9.5 to 6.8 persons per household in central Russia, 1861–1884). The resulting land hunger increased prices 7-fold and made it easier for nobles to sell or rent land rather than farm it themselves. From 1861 to 1900 40% of noble land was sold to peasants (70% of this went to the Commune and by 1900 two thirds of the nobles' arable land was rented to the peasantry). Between 1900–1914, over 20% of remaining noble land was sold but only 3% of the 155 estates over 50,000 destiny. According to the 1897 census, 71% of the top 4 ranks of the civil service were nobles. But in the civil service as a whole, noble membership declined from 49.8% in 1755 to 43.7% in the 1850s and to 30.7% in 1897. There were 1.2 million nobles, about 1% of the population (8% in Poland; compare with 4% in Hungary and 1 to 1.5% in France). Their military influence waned: in the Crimean War 90% of officers were noble, by 1913 the proportion had sunk to 50%. They lived increasingly away from their estates: in 1858 only 15 to 20% of Russian nobles lived in cities, by 1897 it was 47.2%.

By 1904  of noble land was mortgaged to the noble bank.
During the 1905 Russian Revolution 3,000 manors were burnt (15% of the total).

Non-Russian nobility

The Russian imperial nobility was multi-ethnic. Native non-Russians such as the Poles, Georgians, Lithuanians, Tatars, and Germans formed an important segment of the noble estate. The Baltic German nobility was particularly prominent. According to the 1897 census, 0.87% of Russians were classified as hereditary nobles versus 5.29% of Georgians and 4.41% of Poles, followed by Lithuanians, Tatars, Azerbaijanis, and Germans. After the abolition of serfdom, the non-Russian nobility, with the exception of Finland, lost their special status. Later, many of the impoverished or déclassé Polish and Georgian nobles became leaders of nationalist and radical political movements, including Bolshevism.

Quoting historian John Armstrong, Andrei Znamenski describes the Baltic Germans as a "mobilized diaspora" who acted as the Russian Empire's cultural and diplomatic envoys.

Russian Revolution
After the October Revolution of 1917, the new Soviet government legally abolished all classes of nobility. Many members of the Russian nobility who fled Russia after the Bolshevik Revolution played a significant role in the White Emigre communities which settled in Europe, in North America, and in other parts of the world. In the 1920s and 1930s, several Russian nobility associations were established outside Russia, including groups in France, Belgium, and the United States. In New York, the Russian Nobility Association in America, was founded in 1933. Since the collapse of the Soviet Union in 1991 interest among Russians in the role that the Russian nobility played in the historical and cultural development of Russia has grown.

Organization

Nobility was transferred by inheritance or was bestowed by a fount of honour, i.e. the sovereign of the Russian Empire, and was typically ranked as per below, with those of the highest noble prestige ranked first.

 Ancient nobility (descendants from Middle Ages)
 Titled nobility:
 Prince (kniaz Князь): e.g. Prince Potemkin
 Count (graf Граф): e.g. Count Tolstoy
 Baron (baron Барон): e.g. Baron Pahlen
 Hereditary nobility: inherited by all legitimate male-line descendants of a nobleman 
 Personal nobility: granted for the life of the recipient only
 Estateless nobility: obtained without the grant of a landed estate

Unlike the ancient nobility, which was exclusively hereditary, the remaining classes of nobility could be acquired.

A newly designated noble was usually entitled to landownership. A loss of land did not automatically mean loss of nobility. In later Imperial Russia, higher ranks of state service (see Table of Ranks) were automatically granted nobility, not necessarily associated with land ownership.

Russian did not in general employ a nobiliary particle before a surname (as von in German or de in French), however the Russian name suffix -skij which means “of” and is equal to “von” and “de” was used in many noble surnames especially topographic surnames as nobiliary particle. Russian noblemen were accorded an official salutation, or style, that varied by rank:  your high born, your high well born, your well born,  etc.

Titled nobility
Titled nobility was the highest category: those who had titles such as prince, count and baron. The latter two titles were introduced by Peter the Great. A baron or count could be either proprietary (actual) ( владетельный (действительный))—i.e., who owned land in the Russian Empire—or titular (титулярный), i.e., only endowed with a rank or title.

Hereditary nobility
Hereditary nobility was transferred to wife, children, and further direct legal descendants along the male (agnatic) line. In exceptional cases, the emperor could transfer nobility along indirect or female lines, e.g., to preserve a notable family name.

Personal nobility
Personal nobility could, for instance, be acquired by admission to orders of knighthood of the Russian Empire. It was transferable only to the wife.

Estateless nobility
Estateless nobility was nobility acquired by state service, but without a grant of land.

Ancient nobility
In addition, the ancient nobility was recognised, descendants of Rurik, Gediminas and historical boyars and knyazes, e.g., the Shuyskies, Galitzins, Naryshkins, Khilkoffs, Gorchakovs, Belosselsky-Belozerskys and Chelyadnins.

Privileges

Russian nobility possessed the following privileges:

 The right to own estates populated with estate-tied serfs (until 1861), including virtual ownership of the serfs who worked on the estates.
 Style, that varied by rank: The High Born, The High and Well Born, The Well Born, etc. 
 Freedom from compulsory military service (1762–1874; later compulsory military service was introduced which did not exempt the nobility).
 The right to enter specially designated educational institutions, such as Tsarskoye Selo Lyceum, Imperial School of Jurisprudence and Page Corps.
 Freedom from corporal punishment.
 The right to bear and use a coat of arms, introduced by the end of the 17th century.

Noble titles of the Russian Empire 
The Russian Tsardom came into being around the Grand Duchy of Moscow by the incorporation of various political entities surrounding it. After Peter the Great returned from his grand tour he implemented reforms aimed at westernization of his realm, including officially adopting the title of Emperor of All Russia, preceding the traditional Slavic title of Tsar. Peter and his successors also streamlined the stratification of the Russian nobility, adopting European-style titles such as Count and Baron and discontinuing the archaic titles of Boyars. The Russian system of noble titles evolved into its final form:

Acquisition
Hereditary nobility could be achieved in the following ways: 1) by Imperial grant to individuals or families; 2) by attaining a certain military or civil officer's rank while in active service; 3) by being awarded an order of chivalry of the Russian Empire.

Between 1722 and 1845 hereditary nobility was given to military officers who achieved the 14th rank of ensign, to civil servants who achieved the 8th rank of Collegiate Assessor and to any person who was awarded any order of the Russian Empire (since 1831 – except the Polish order of Virtuti Militari).

Between 1845 and 1856 hereditary nobility was given to military officers who achieved the 8th rank of major/captain 3rd rank, to civil servants who achieved the 5th rank of State Councillor and to any person who was awarded the Order of Saint George or the Order of Saint Vladimir of any class, or any order of the Russian Empire of the first class.

From 1856 to 1917 hereditary nobility was given to military officers who achieved the 6th rank of colonel/captain 1st rank, to civil servants who achieved the 4th rank of Active State Councillor and to any person who was awarded the Order of Saint George of any class or the Order of Saint Vladimir of any class (since 1900 - of the third class or higher), or any order of the Russian Empire of the first class.

Personal nobility could be acquired in the following ways: 1) by Imperial grant; 2) by attaining the 14th military rank of ensign or the 9th civil rank of Titular Councillor; 3) by being awarded the orders of the Russian Empire unless those gave hereditary nobility; except merchants (unless those were awarded between 1826 and 1832), who acquired honorary citizenship instead. Personal nobility was not inherited by children but was shared by the recipient's wife.

Other ranks and positions
 Marshal of Nobility
 Odnodvortsy
 Okolnichy
 Stolnik

Gallery

References

 The Russian Nobility Association in Europe (Union de la Noblesse Russe)
 Official site of the Principal Russian Nobility Association
 The Russian Nobility Association in America
 Official site of the Imperial House of Russia

Further reading
 Blum, Jerome. Lord and Peasant in Russia from the Ninth to the Nineteenth Century. Princeton University Press, 1951.
 Jenkins, Michael. "The Golden Years of the Russian Aristocracy" History Today (Feb1970), Vol. 20 Issue 2, pp. 79–85 online, 1900–1917.
 

 
Society of the Russian Empire